John Brewer Brown (May 13, 1836 – May 16, 1898) was an American member of the United States House of Representatives, elected by Maryland's 1st congressional district.

Born in Philadelphia, Pennsylvania, Brown attended Centreville Academy and Dickinson College in Carlisle, Pennsylvania, where he studied law. He was admitted to the bar in 1857 and practiced in Centreville. He became a member of the Maryland House of Delegates in 1870 and served in the Maryland State Senate from 1888 to 1892.

Elected as a Democrat to the 52nd United States Congress to fill the vacancy caused by the resignation of Henry Page, Brown served from November 8, 1892, to March 3, 1893. He declined to be a candidate for renomination in 1892 and resumed the practice of law. Brown died in Centreville and was interred in Chesterfield Cemetery.

References
 

Democratic Party Maryland state senators
Democratic Party members of the Maryland House of Delegates
Politicians from Philadelphia
1836 births
1898 deaths
Democratic Party members of the United States House of Representatives from Maryland
People from Centreville, Maryland
19th-century American politicians